William Henry Drake (June 4, 1856 – 1926) born in New York, was an American painter and illustrator known for his illustrations of The Jungle Book by Rudyard Kipling.

Biography 
Drake studied at the Académie Julian in Paris, with Jean-Joseph Benjamin-Constant and Henri Lucien Doucet.

Back from Europe, he studied at the Cincinnati School of Design, and would often go to the zoo, where he could draw the animals. He was then employed by the Museum of Natural History. He continued to study at the Art Students League of New York. 
In 1878 he worked as a freelance pen-and-ink artist for such periodicals as Century or Harper’s with animal studies, still lifes and landscapes.

Having developed skills in drawing wild animals, particularly wild cats, in 1894, he received commissions to illustrate books, including The Jungle Books, by Kipling.
In 1902 he was made an associate member of the National Academy of Design.
Drake moved to California in 1920.

References

External links 

 William Henry Drake on Artnet

1856 births
American expatriates in France
Académie Julian alumni
19th-century American painters
American male painters
20th-century American painters
American illustrators
National Academy of Design alumni
1926 deaths
19th-century American male artists
20th-century American male artists